K-1 World Grand Prix 2000 Final was a kickboxing event promoted by the K-1 organization. It was the eighth K-1 Grand Prix final, involving eight of the world's top fighters, with all bouts fought under K-1 Rules (100 kg/156-220 lbs). The eight finalists were a mixture of invitees, some of whom had been at the previous year's final, or had qualified via preliminary tournaments (for more detail on this see bulleted list below).

As well as tournament bouts there were also two 'Super Fights', one involving Japanese middleweight star Takayuki Kohiruimaki against Wilreid Montargne, fought under K-1 MAX Rules (70 kg/152 lbs), the other involving UFC legend Frank Shamrock against Elvis Sinosic in a kickboxing match fought under K-1 Rules. In addition, there were also two 'freshman fights' involving local fighters. In total there were sixteen fighters at the event, representing nine countries. 

The tournament champion was Ernesto Hoost who defeated Ray Sefo in the final by third round unanimous decision. This would be Ernesto Hoost's third K-1 World Grand Prix victory, adding to the one he had won the previous year and another in '97. Ray Sefo would be making his first K-1 World Grand Prix final appearance. The event was held at the Tokyo Dome in Tokyo, Japan on Sunday December 10, 2000, in front of 65,000 spectators.

Tournament Qualifiers 
Cyril Abidi - K-1 World Grand Prix 2000 in Yokohama runner up
Peter Aerts - Invitee, previous years final
Francisco Filho - K-1 World Grand Prix 2000 in Yokohama winner
Mirko Cro Cop - K-1 World Grand Prix 2000 in Fukuoka runner up 
Ernesto Hoost - Reigning champion, K-1 World Grand Prix 2000 in Nagoya runner up 
Stefan Leko - Invitee
Musashi - K-1 Spirits 2000 winner
Ray Sefo - Invitee, previous years final

Jérôme Le Banner and Mike Bernardo both won the K-1 World Grand Prix 2000 in Nagoya and K-1 World Grand Prix 2000 in Fukuoka respectively but were unable to participate in the tournament due to injury.

K-1 World Grand Prix 2000 Final Tournament

* Peter Aerts was injured so Cyril Abidi replaced him in the Semi Finals

Results

See also 
 List of K-1 events
 List of K-1 champions
 List of male kickboxers

References

External links 
 K-1sport.de - Your Source for Everything K-1
 K-1 Official Website
 IKF K-1 NEWS SITE

K-1 events
2000 in kickboxing
Kickboxing in Japan
Sports competitions in Tokyo